Zoran Popović (born 28 May 1988) is a Serbian professional footballer who plays as a goalkeeper for Serbian club Čukarički on loan from Red Star Belgrade.

Career
While playing for Voždovac in the 2016–17 Serbian SuperLiga, Popović was named in the competition's Team of the Season.

On 12 February 2018, Popović was transferred to Norwegian club Bodø/Glimt.

On 26 June 2018, Popović signed two-year deal with Red Star Belgrade.

Honours

Individual
 Serbian SuperLiga Team of the Season: 2016–17

Club
Red Star Belgrade
 Serbian SuperLiga (4): 2018–19, 2019–20, 2020–21, 2021–22
 Serbian Cup (2): 2020–21, 2021–22

References

External links
 
 
 

 

1988 births
Living people
People from Pakrac
Serbs of Croatia
Association football goalkeepers
Serbian footballers
FK Čukarički players
FK Vršac players
FK Palić players
FK Voždovac players
FK Beograd players
FK Vojvodina players
FK Napredak Kruševac players
FK Bodø/Glimt players
Red Star Belgrade footballers
Serbian First League players
Serbian SuperLiga players
Eliteserien players
Serbian expatriate footballers
Expatriate footballers in Norway
Serbian expatriate sportspeople in Norway